Charlie Leabeater was an Australian soccer player who played as a full-back. He played for Granville and the Australia national team. He was also a cricket player, rugby player and swimmer.

International career
Leabeater played two international matches for Australia, debuting in a 4–1 win against Canada on 23 June 1924 and playing his final match in a 1–0 win against Canada on 26 July 1924.

Career statistics

International

Honours
Granville
 Sydney Metropolitan First Division: 1923, 1924, 1925

References

Australian soccer players
Australia international soccer players
Association football defenders